Fernelia is a genus of flowering plants in the family Rubiaceae. The genus is endemic to the Mascarene Islands.

Species
Fernelia buxifolia 
Fernelia decipiens 
Fernelia obovata 
Fernelia pedunculata

References

Rubiaceae genera
Octotropideae
Taxa named by Philibert Commerson
Taxa named by Jean-Baptiste Lamarck